Paulina Gálvez may refer to:
 Paulina Gálvez (actress) (born 1969), Spanish actress
 Paulina Gálvez (Miss International), Colombian pageant winner